The Kaohsiung American School (KAS) is a private, Pre-K through grade 12 college preparatory school located in Zuoying District, Kaohsiung, Taiwan. The school was established in 1989 and it is accredited by the Western Association of Schools and Colleges. The current superintendent is Mr. James Laney, Jr. The school has been accredited to teach the IB Diploma Programme since August 2010 and the Middle Years Program (MYP) since September 2015.

Facilities

In the spring of 2015, a new campus was completed. Phase 2 of the construction encompassed the athletics installations and was completed in January 2017.

Facilities include a 400-seat auditorium, lecture hall, and a 3-story central hub which houses a library, exhibition hall, and a media center. The Dr. Thomas Farrell Athletics Complex, which opened in 2017, houses a swimming pool, American hardwood indoor basketball court, and a rooftop tennis court.

LEED Certified Campus
KAS is an American school in Taiwan, as certified by the US Green Building Council (USGBC). The school's Academics and Arts complex earned a Silver rating, and Athletics complex carries a Gold rating.

Academics

Elementary Division
The Kaohsiung American School's elementary division, from Pre-K (4 years old) to grade five, allows students to receive classes from specialists each week in Art, Music, and Physical Education. Students in grades 1-5 also have weekly classes in Information Technology. In addition, students receive Chinese language for 220 minutes per week beginning in grade 1. ELL (English language learning) is provided for students in grades 1-10 who require additional support in English language and is taught by a qualified specialist. Library classes are scheduled either weekly or on a flexible schedule with the Librarian. In the 2018-19 school year, KAS added an Inclusion Coordinator whose office assists students with the tools they need to excel at grade level, and this department was expanded in the 2020-21 school year.

Middle school
The Kaohsiung American School's middle school division includes grade six to grade eight, and marks the start of the Middle Years Program (MYP) of the International Baccalaureate. The MYP provides an educational framework of formative and summative assessments around clearly defined criteria that measure a student's progress across a variety of classwork and academic pursuits. Additional English Language Learner (ELL) support is available for students at the middle school level. Students have the opportunity to experience a balanced curriculum that includes physical education, world language instruction, humanities, arts, science, and mathematics. The middle school also encourages a variety of student-led and teacher-led clubs and extra-curricular activities.

High school
The Kaohsiung American School's high school division runs from grade nine to grade twelve. Additional English Language Learner (ELL) support is available for students at the high school level. Upon reaching eleventh grade, students are given a choice to participate in the IB Diploma Programme (DP). Students who participate have the opportunity to sit for the IB exams in their respective subjects and earn an IB diploma. Students can also choose from a selection of other grade-level courses. All students in the high school have access to an onsite college advisory office to assist in the guidance and application to universities and colleges in the United States and worldwide.

Technology
The KAS Learning Technology program is a catalyst to all educational experiences. Students in every classroom have access to technology through individual and shared computing resources, including 1:1 laptops beginning in 3rd grade. The campus is designed with technology seamlessly integrated through all facets of classroom design. Students connect to high speed and high capacity wireless, no matter where the learning is taking place. Technology throughout campus is integrated under the supervision of the Director of Learning Technology, Brian Meehan.

IB (International Baccalaureate)
KAS was authorized to offer several IB courses and the IB Diploma Programme beginning in August 2010.  The decision to offer the IB Diploma was to reflect the school's belief that the program offers the best opportunities for the students’ learning and for their university preparation. Students may choose to pursue the Diploma or individual certificates, or they may choose to enroll in courses for regular credit only.  The school was authorized to offer the IB Middle Years Program beginning in November 2015.

See also
 Education in Taiwan
Western Association of Schools and Colleges
American Institute in Taiwan

References

External links

 American School Facebook Page
  Kaohsiung American School official website
  KAS on Google Maps

Educational institutions established in 1989
1989 establishments in Taiwan
Schools accredited by the Western Association of Schools and Colleges
International schools in Kaohsiung
American international schools in Taiwan
Association of China and Mongolia International Schools
Zuoying District